Jerome Henry Kidder (October 26, 1842 in Baltimore, Maryland - April 8, 1889 in Woods Hole, Massachusetts) was a surgeon and astronomer.

Early education
Kidder graduated Phi Beta Kappa from Harvard University in 1862 with a B.A. and a M.A. in 1875.  Between his degrees, Kidder enlisted in the 10th Maryland Volunteer Infantry and later also as a medical cadet in the Union army.

Career
Kidder received his M.D. degree from the University of Maryland in 1866 and eventually rose to the rank of surgeon in 1876, during which time he had served in Japan and elsewhere.  In 1869 the king of Portugal conferred upon him the Royal Order of Christ, the decoration authorized by joint resolution of the United States Congress in 1870.  In 1874 he was on the USS Swatara as surgeon and naturalist on the expedition to the Kerguelen Islands for the observation of the transit of Venus.  He did research for the Smithsonian and Naval Laboratory of Washington, D.C. throughout his life, and served on the United States Fish Commission.  He left a bequest of $5000 to help establish the Smithsonian Astrophysical Observatory.

References
Stafford, Morgan Hewitt. A Genealogy of the Kidder Family: Comprising the Descendants in the Male Line of Ensign James Kidder 1626-1676 of Cambridge and Billerica in the Colony of Massachusetts Bay. Rutland, VT: Tuttle Publishing Co., Inc., 1941.

Rathbun, Richard, "Jerome Henry Kidder," Bulletin of the Philosophical Society of Washington, Vol. 11, 1890, pp. 480–488.

1842 births
1889 deaths
Harvard University alumni
University of Maryland School of Medicine alumni
Physicians from Baltimore
Scientists from Baltimore
United States Fish Commission personnel